Robert Alden Cornog (July 7, 1912 – July 17, 1998) was a physicist and engineer who helped develop the atomic bomb and missile systems, and made significant discoveries regarding isotopes of hydrogen and helium.

A native of Portland, Oregon, who grew up in Iowa City, Cornog earned a bachelor's degree in mechanical engineering at the University of Iowa. After working for the United States Bureau of Reclamation on the Boulder Dam design, he studied at UC Berkeley for his doctorate in physics.

His graduate student research led to the co-discovery, with Luis Alvarez, that hydrogen of atomic mass 3 (tritium) was radioactive, and that helium of mass 3 helium-3) occurs in nature. He also assisted Emilio Segrè in the discovery of element 85, astatine.

During World War II, Cornog designed magnetic equipment for ships and went to work on the Manhattan Project, successively at UC Berkeley, Princeton University and in Los Alamos, New Mexico. Cornog became chief engineer of the ordnance division of the atomic bomb development team and was involved in the development of the bomb's trigger mechanism.

Following World War II, he focused on aerodynamics, nuclear energy, and rocket engineering. He worked on missile systems for several Southern California companies, including Northrop, Space Technology Laboratories and Ramo-Wooldridge Corporation, which became TRW. Also an expert on vacuum technology, Cornog headed Vacuum Enterprises from 1967 to 1974 and managed product development for Torr Vacuum Products until 1984. He held several patents and served as a technical advisor on the film Fat Man and Little Boy, about the atomic bomb.

Envisioning peaceful uses for nuclear and space technology, Cornog in 1959 foresaw a world in 40 to 50 years with worldwide color television broadcasts, satellites assembled in space and accurate weather prediction.

Cornog was a close associate of rocket pioneer and occultist Jack Parsons. Science fiction author Robert A. Heinlein, a friend, dedicated his 1961 novel Stranger in a Strange Land to Cornog. Donald Kingsbury dedicated his 1986 novel The Moon Goddess and the Son to several people including "Robert Cornog for discussing the economics of the leoport."

References

External links
  Robert Cornog interview video
 

1912 births
1998 deaths
20th-century American physicists
20th-century American engineers
Manhattan Project people
University of Iowa alumni
University of California, Berkeley alumni